The Kipchak languages (also known as the Kypchak, Qypchaq, Qypshaq or the Northwestern Turkic languages) are a sub-branch of the Turkic language family spoken by approximately 28 million people in much of Central Asia and Eastern Europe, spanning from Ukraine to China. Some of the most widely spoken languages in this group are Kazakh, Kyrgyz and Tatar.

Linguistic features
The Kipchak languages share a number of features that have led linguists to classify them together. Some of these features are shared with other Common Turkic languages; others are unique to the Kipchak family.

Shared features
Loss of initial *h (preserved only in Khalaj), see above example

Unique features

Family-specific
Extensive labial vowel harmony (e.g. olor vs. olar "them") 
Frequent fortition (in the form of assibilation) of initial  (e.g. *etti > etti "seven")

Language-specific
In both Tatar and Bashkir, the original mid and high vowels are swapped in position by vowel raising and lowering:

Classification
The Kipchak languages may be broken down into four groups based on geography and shared features (languages in bold are still spoken today):

See also
Kipchaks
Kipchaks in Georgia
Cuman people
Cuman language
Cumania
Kalpak

Notes

References

Bibliography

 
Agglutinative languages
Turkic languages
Vowel-harmony languages